Madonna and Child with St Herculanus and St Constantius or Madonna of the Kitchen is a 1515 painting by Perugino, now in the Galleria Nazionale dell'Umbria in Perugia. Its title refers to the fact that it once hung in the former kitchen of the Palazzo dei Priori in Perugia. The two accompanying saints are Herculanus and Constantius, both local saints to Perugia.

It restored in the 20th century, recovering its original colours. Bombe, Adolfo Venturi, F. Canuti, Domenico Gnoli and Berenson had previously held it to be studio work, but after the restoration decided it was an autograph work with studio assistance. Santi and Cavalcaselle consider the work's attribution to Perugino to be doubtful and argue it was an autograph work subjected to major alterations by assistants at a late stage in its production.

Bibliography 
  Vittoria Garibaldi, Perugino, in Pittori del Rinascimento, Scala, Florence, 2004 
  Pierluigi De Vecchi, Elda Cerchiari, I tempi dell'arte, volume 2, Bompiani, Milan, 1999 
  Stefano Zuffi, Il Quattrocento, Electa, Milan, 2004 
  Entry on Frammentiarte.it 

Paintings of the Madonna and Child by Pietro Perugino
1515 paintings
Collections of the Galleria Nazionale dell'Umbria